Fry Canyon was a small community in San Juan County, Utah, United States, located in Fry Canyon, just south of White Canyon,  west on State Route 95 from its junction with U.S. Route 191 at Blanding.

Description
Fry Canyon was a uranium boom town during the 1950s, and the Fry Canyon Lodge opened in 1955, but it has since closed in 2007.

The activities of a uranium ore upgrader mill (1957-1960) and a subsequent copper heap leach operation (1963-1968) at Fry Spring, two miles southeast of Fry Canyon, caused uranium, copper and radium contamination of groundwater in colluvial channel deposits within Fry Creek. The U.S. Geological Survey (with funding from the U.S. Environmental Protection Agency, and other agencies) installed three permeable reactive barriers, containing three different reactive materials (foamed zero-valent iron (ZVI) pellets, bone charcoal pellets, amorphous ferric oxyhydroxide (AFO) slurry mixed with pea gravel), at the site, which is managed by the U.S. Bureau of Land Management.

See also

 List of ghost towns in Utah

References

External links

Mining communities in Utah
Ghost towns in Utah
Ghost towns in San Juan County, Utah